Cophixalus pulchellus is a species of frog in the family Microhylidae. The specific name pulchellus is diminutive of Latin pulcher, meaning "beautiful".

Description
The snout is truncate. The tympanum is partly distinct. The eyes are moderately large. The fingers and the toes bear discs, but the one on the first finger is very reduced. No webbing is present. The dorsum has yellowish-grey ground color and is decorated with black blotches. The area between the eyes is yellowish.

Habitat and conservation
It has been classified in 2004 as "data deficient" on the IUCN Red List because it was only recently discovered, and there was very little information on the extent of its occurrence, status, and ecological requirements. Its population trend was unknown at its last assessment. Its population is known only from a single, discovered specimen. There are no known threats to this species, and its location probably safe from human disturbance at the time.

References

pulchellus
Amphibians of Papua New Guinea
Endemic fauna of Papua New Guinea
Endemic fauna of New Guinea
Amphibians described in 2000
Taxonomy articles created by Polbot